Liquid Soul is the self-titled debut album by Liquid Soul.

Track listing
 "Preview" – 	0:26
 "World's On A Leash" – 	4:36
 "Schitzophrenia" – 	3:37
 "Equinox" – 	5:05
 "The Good One" – 	0:14
 "Afro Loop" – 	5:22
 "Java Junkie" – 	4:43
 "New E" – 	4:19
 "Righteous" – 	4:44
 "Footprints" – 	4:19
 "Jazz Machine" – 	3:37
 "Black Earth" – 	3:01
 "What A Story" – 	2:47
 "Blue Groove Freestyle" – 	9:41
 "Freddie The Freeloader" – 	4:09
  "Your Time Is Up" – 	0:18

Personnel
Jesse De La Pena  – Turntables	
Ron Haynes  – Trumpet, Flugelhorn	
Frankie Hill  – Keyboards	
Tommy Klein  – Guitar	
Dan Leali  – Percussion, Drums	
Ricky Showalter  – Bass	
Mars Williams  – Saxophone, Producer, Mixing

Production
Mark Bales  – Engineer
Rick Barnes  – Editing, Mixing, Pre-Mastering
Van Christie  – Mixing
Steve Jacula  – Engineer, Mixing
Neil Jensen  – Engineer, Assistant Engineer, Mixing, Live Sound
Jim Marcus  – Editing
Mars  – Mixing
Jason More  – Design
Sandy Sager  – Photography
David Suycott  – Editing
Matt Warren  – Engineer, Mixing

References

1996 debut albums
Liquid Soul albums
Ark 21 Records albums